Muncy Historic District is a national historic district located at Muncy, Lycoming County, Pennsylvania.  The district includes 298 contributing buildings in the central business district and surrounding residential area of Muncy. The buildings date as early as 1798, and are representative of Victorian, Georgian, and Federal style architecture. Notable buildings include the St. Andrew Lutheran Church, Muncy Presbyterian Church, William McCarty Residence, Walton-Weaver Residence, Gray-Bodine Residence, Boal-Griggs Building, Clapp-Muncy Historical Society Building, Jacob E. Cooke Row Houses, Clapp-Smith Building, Rankin-Brindle Building, Lloyd Building, Lycoming County Mutual Fire Insurance Building, Fahnestock-Petrikin Building, Muncy Valley House, and the D.O. Snyder Building. The St. James Episcopal Church, designed by Richard Upjohn, is listed separately on the National Register.

It was added to the National Register of Historic Places in 1980.

References

Historic districts on the National Register of Historic Places in Pennsylvania
Federal architecture in Pennsylvania
Georgian architecture in Pennsylvania
Historic districts in Lycoming County, Pennsylvania
National Register of Historic Places in Lycoming County, Pennsylvania